Luke Mudgway (born 12 June 1996) is a New Zealand racing cyclist, who currently rides for UCI ProTeam . He competed in the points race at the 2016 UCI Track Cycling World Championships.

Major results

2014
 1st  Madison, UCI Junior Track World Championships (with Regan Gough)
2016
 3rd Overall Tour of China II
1st Stage 3
2018
 9th Overall Joe Martin Stage Race
 10th Overall Tour of China II
 10th Gravel and Tar
2019
 1st Gravel and Tar
2020
 2nd Gravel and Tar
2021
 2nd Gravel and Tar Classic
 6th Overall A Travers les Hauts de France
 8th Overall New Zealand Cycle Classic
1st  Mountains classification
1st Stage 2
2022
 1st  Overall Grand Prix Cycliste de Gemenc
1st  Points classification
 3rd Districtenpijl - Ekeren-Deurne
2023
 New Zealand Cycle Classic
1st  Points classification
1st Stage 4

References

External links

1996 births
Living people
New Zealand male cyclists
21st-century New Zealand people
Sportspeople from Palmerston North